Max 2: White House Hero is a 2017 American adventure film produced by Warner Bros. and Sunswept Entertainment. The film was released by Orion Pictures and Warner Bros. Pictures on May 5, 2017.  It is a sequel to the 2015 film Max. The movie was filmed on location in and around Vancouver, British Columbia. Principal photography on the film began in June 2016 and wrapped on July 13, 2016.

Plot 
Max is assigned to the White House while Charlie, the Secret Service dog, is on maternity leave. He meets TJ, a 12-year-old boy, who is the President's son. Due to his father's high profile, he is trying hard to fit in and lead a normal life. During a state visit by the Russian Prime Minister and his daughter, Alexandra (Alex), TJ is asked to accompany her, during their stay. TJ befriends Alex, but when they sneak out of the White House in an attempt to find a party thrown by some of TJ's new friends at school, two masked villains try to kidnap TJ and Alex.

Luckily for the kids, Max has also managed to sneak out of the White House, following TJ and Alex, and jumps in to save TJ. Max bites the ankle of one of the bandits and Alex and TJ are able to escape the kidnappers' clutches and run back to the White House, where they promptly get in hot water with their parents and the White House security detail. TJ and Alex form an unlikely alliance and start investigating the nefarious doings of all they suspect. As their many attempts at sleuthing backfire and a harrowing attempt at harming the First Lady is narrowly foiled by Max, the Secret Service finally persuades President Bennett to relieve Max of his duties.

After that incident, the Russian President declares to President Bennett, "If you cannot protect your children, how are you going to protect our children?" and decides to return to Moscow, cutting his visit short. A despondent TJ cannot sleep and while searching for an early morning snack in the kitchen discovers that Chef Coop is the Russian mole. Coop locks TJ in the freezer and escapes. Meanwhile, Olga tricks Alex into following her into woods, so that Coop can abduct her.

Max finally escapes from his cage and smashes back into the residence to save TJ, alerting everyone to the misdeeds at hand. After a heroic pursuit of the criminals by Max and TJ with both Presidents and Agent Thorn, the perpetrators are captured and Alex is rescued. Bennett apologizes to TJ for not believing him and assures him that the First Family is a family first. TJ and Alex convince their fathers to resume their talks where a historic agreement is reached and an award for bravery is bestowed upon Max. In the end, TJ and Alex say goodbye with a kiss thanks to Max nudging TJ, and he gets a surprise; Charlie had three puppies and TJ and Max wants to keep them all and starts playing with them.

Cast 
 Zane Austin as TJ Bennett
 Francesca Capaldi as Alexandra "Alex" Bragov
 Lochlyn Munro as President Thomas Bennett 
 Andrew Kavadas as President Vladimir Bragov
 Reese Alexander as Secret Service Agent Thorn
 Carrie Genzel as First Lady Maureen Bennett
 Bradley Stryker as Chef Coop
 Kathryn Kirkpatrick as FSB Agent Olga
 Bruce Blain as Russian Chef
 Jessica Roch as White House Chef
 Curtis Lum as Agent Nelson
 Lucia Walters as Tour Guide
 Gabriel LaBelle as Alfred
 Garry Chalk as Colonel Jones
 Carlos, Jagger and Dude as Max

Home media 
The film was released on Blu-ray on May 23, 2017 by Warner Bros. Home Entertainment. It is the first Orion Pictures film to be distributed by Warner Bros. in home media since Zelig.

References

External links 

 
 

2017 films
2010s adventure drama films
2010s war films
American adventure drama films
American drama films
Films about dogs
Films set in Washington, D.C.
Films set in the White House
Films set in Maryland
Films shot in British Columbia
Orion Pictures films
Warner Bros. direct-to-video films
American sequel films
Films scored by Randy Edelman
Films directed by Brian Levant
2017 drama films
2010s English-language films
2010s American films